Nowy Goniwilk  is a village in the administrative district of Gmina Żelechów, within Garwolin County, Masovian Voivodeship, in east-central Poland. The village has a population of 314.

References

Nowy Goniwilk